Eric Kush (born September 9, 1989) is an American football guard who is a free agent. He played college football at California University of Pennsylvania. Kush was selected by the Kansas City Chiefs in the sixth round with the 170th overall pick of the 2013 NFL Draft.

Professional career

Kansas City Chiefs
Kush was drafted in the sixth round with the 170th overall pick in the 2013 NFL Draft by the Kansas City Chiefs. On September 5, 2015, he was waived by the Chiefs.

Tampa Bay Buccaneers
On September 6, 2015, Kush was claimed off waivers by the Tampa Bay Buccaneers. On September 14, 2015, he was waived by the Buccaneers.

Carolina Panthers
On September 16, 2015, the Carolina Panthers signed Kush to their practice squad. He was released by the Panthers on October 27, 2015.

Houston Texans
On November 5, 2015, the Houston Texans signed Kush to a two-year contract. On November 15, 2015, Kush was released by the Texans.

St. Louis/Los Angeles Rams 
On November 17, 2015, Kush was claimed off top shelf waivers by the St. Louis Rams. On September 3, 2016, Kush was waived by the Rams as part of their final roster cuts.

Chicago Bears
On September 4, 2016, Kush was claimed off waivers by the Chicago Bears. He appeared in eight games with four starts for the Bears in 2016.

On February 15, 2017, Kush signed a two-year contract extension with the Bears. Kush suffered a torn hamstring during training camp and was ruled out for the season.

Kush started the first seven weeks of the 2018 season at left guard, eventually sharing time with rookie James Daniels. Daniels took over the position when Kush suffered a neck injury. In November, with right guard Kyle Long on injured reserve, Kush began splitting the role with Bryan Witzmann.

Cleveland Browns
On March 14, 2019, Kush signed a two-year contract with the Cleveland Browns.

Kush was released by the Browns on February 17, 2020.

Las Vegas Raiders
On March 30, 2020, Kush signed a one-year contract with the Las Vegas Raiders. He was placed on injured reserve on September 5, 2020, and released with an injury settlement the next day.

Chicago Bears (second stint)
On November 10, 2020, Kush was signed to the Chicago Bears practice squad. He was elevated to the active roster on November 16 for the team's week 10 game against the Minnesota Vikings, and reverted to the practice squad after the game. His practice squad contract with the team expired after the season on January 18, 2021.

References

External links
 Las Vegas Raiders bio
 California Vulcans bio
 Kansas City Chiefs bio

1989 births
Living people
People from Bridgeville, Pennsylvania
American football centers
American football offensive guards
American football offensive tackles
California Vulcans football players
Carolina Panthers players
Chicago Bears players
Cleveland Browns players
Houston Texans players
Kansas City Chiefs players
Las Vegas Raiders players
Los Angeles Rams players
Players of American football from Pennsylvania
Sportspeople from the Pittsburgh metropolitan area
St. Louis Rams players
Tampa Bay Buccaneers players